The CETIN building is a building complex in Žižkov, Prague 3 district near Olšany Cemetery. Built in 1979 as the Central Telecommunications Building (Czech: Ústřední telekomunikační budova), it became the headquarters of major operators such as SPT Telecom and O2 Czech Republic after the Velvet Revolution and formation of the Czech Republic. In 2017, the complex was bought by Czech developer Central Group, and until 2022, it will serve as headquarters of the CETIN telecommunications company. The main tower has a roof height of 85 meters and stands a total of 96 meters with its antenna.

References

See also 

 List of tallest buildings in the Czech Republic

Prague 3
Office buildings in the Czech Republic
Communication towers
Towers in the Czech Republic
Office buildings completed in 1979
Žižkov
1979 establishments in Czechoslovakia
2023 disestablishments in the Czech Republic
Buildings and structures demolished in 2023
20th-century architecture in the Czech Republic